Lennox Lewis vs. Tony Tucker, billed as Star Spangled Glory, was a heavyweight professional boxing match contested between WBC champion Lennox Lewis and the WBC's number one ranked contender Tony Tucker. The bout took place on May 8, 1993 at the Thomas & Mack Center in Paradise, Nevada, U.S. Lewis retained his WBC title via unanimous decision.

Background
After defeating the WBC's number one ranked heavyweight Donovan "Razor" Ruddock on October 31, 1992, Lennox Lewis became the mandatory challenger for the WBC heavyweight title, which at the time was unified with both the WBA and IBF versions of the heavyweight title. Two weeks after his victory over Ruddock, challenger Riddick Bowe defeated champion Evander Holyfield to claim all three titles and become the new undisputed heavyweight champion. Bowe and Lewis' camps attempted to get a deal done but negotiations broke down after Lewis' manager Frank Maloney rejected both deals that Bowe's manager Rock Newman offered. The first deal offered was a 90–10 split between the two fighters that would net Lewis $3 million while Bowe would take home $29 million, but Maloney refused the deal, calling it "absurd". Newman then offered Lewis $2.5 million to take an interim fight against an opponent of his choosing after which he would proceed with his championship fight with Bowe where he would earn an additional $9 million but that deal was also refused. Because a deal could not be made, Bowe instead chose to vacate his WBC title and proceeded to make the first defense of his remaining titles against Michael Dokes. Based on the strength of his victory over Ruddock, the WBC decided to name Lewis the new WBC heavyweight champion. Though George Foreman had been brought up by Lewis as a possible opponent, he ultimately agreed to face the WBC's number one contender Tony Tucker in his first defense. Tucker briefly held the IBF heavyweight title in 1987 but lost it in his first defense against Mike Tyson only three months later. After his loss to Tyson, Tucker was out of boxing for over two years before launching a comeback late in 1989. Tucker was then able to put together a string of 14 consecutive wins to get his record up 48–1 by the time of his fight with Lewis. Despite his impressive record, Tucker was given little chance of defeating Lewis and came into the fight as a 6–1 underdog.

The fight
Like his previous championship fight with Tyson, Tucker was able to go the full twelve rounds with the much younger Lewis but was unable to put together much offense during the bout. Lewis was able to twice knockdown Tucker, who had previously never been knocked down in 50 fights as a professional. The first came during the final minute of the third round. Tucker attempted to hit Lewis with a jab with about 40 seconds left, but Lewis was able to dodge it and quickly landed a strong right hook that dropped Tucker to the canvas for the first time in his career. In round eight, Tucker seemingly had Lewis in trouble after landing an over 20-punch combination late in the round. However, Lewis would turn the tables on Tucker and dominate the final 25 seconds of the round, landing several power punches that clearly hurt Tucker, who tried in vain to clinch Lewis and survive the remainder of the round. After failing to hold on to Lewis, Tucker backed into the corner with 10 seconds left and was promptly met with a three-punch combination from Lewis, though he was able to get a hold of Lewis and survive the round without being knocked down. As round nine began, Lewis charged at Tucker and was quickly able to gain a second knockdown after landing a right hook to the side of Tucker's head. Nevertheless, Tucker was able to survive the remainder of the fight, but Lewis was able to pick up a lopsided unanimous decision with scores of 118–111, 117–111 and 116–112.

Undercard
Confirmed bouts:

Broadcasting

References

Tucker
World Boxing Council heavyweight championship matches
1993 in boxing
Boxing in Las Vegas
1993 in sports in Nevada
May 1993 sports events in the United States